Events in the year 1839 in Chile.

Incumbents
President: José Joaquín Prieto

Events
January 6 - War of the Confederation: Battle of Buin
January 12 - War of the Confederation: Battle of Casma
January 20 - War of the Confederation: Battle of Yungay

Births

Deaths